István Dániel Szögi (born 12 September 1995) is a Hungarian middle- and long-distance runner. He represented his country at the 2021 European Indoor Championships finishing eighth in the 1500 metres. He made his first Olympic appearance in Tokyo in 2021 running in the Men’s 1500m event.

Before turning to running he was a competitive kayaker.

International competitions

Personal bests
Outdoor
800 metres – 1:47.62 (Pápa 2022)
1500 metres – 3:36.63 (Montreuil  2021)
Mile – 3:56.72 (Cork 2022)
3000 metres – 8:25.55 (Budapest 2016)
5000 metres – 14:09.88 (Veszprém 2020)
10.000 metres – 30:04.34 (Budapest 2014)
Indoor
800 metres – 1:47.75 (Budapest 2021)
1500 metres – 3:37.55 (Vienna 2021) NR
One mile – 3:58.00 (Ostrav 2023) NR
2000 metres – 5:00.73 (Liévin 2022) NR
3000 metres – 7:57.26 (Budapest 2023)
5000 metres – 15:40.57 (Bozeman 2016)

References

1995 births
Living people
Hungarian male middle-distance runners
Hungarian male long-distance runners
Hungarian expatriates in the United States
People from Tata, Hungary
Florida State Seminoles men's track and field athletes
Athletes (track and field) at the 2020 Summer Olympics
Olympic athletes of Hungary
Sportspeople from Komárom-Esztergom County
21st-century Hungarian people